The 2002–03 season was Manchester United's 11th season in the Premier League, and their 28th consecutive season in the top division of English football. This season saw the club finish at the top of the Premier League table, after their lowest finish in the history of the Premier League the previous season, when they came third. In order to win the title, the team had to pull Arsenal back from an eight-point lead at the beginning of March. United also finished as runners-up in the League Cup, with Liverpool eventually taking the prize. The club also broke the English transfer record for the third time in just over a year as they paid £29.1 million for Leeds United defender Rio Ferdinand.

At the end of the season, United midfielder David Beckham moved to Real Madrid in a £25 million deal, having spent 12 years at United (eight of them as a first-team regular). Meanwhile, 37-year-old centre-back Laurent Blanc announced his retirement from playing. Fellow centre-back David May was given a free transfer after nine years at the club, the last five of which had seen his first team opportunities limited to a handful of appearances.

Season review
After ending the previous season by surrendering the title to Arsenal at home and finishing third behind rejuvenated Liverpool, Alex Ferguson reiterated his desire to dominate English football by signing a three-year contract in the late winter of 2002. By the end of the season, Ferguson got his wish and bagged Manchester United their fifteenth domestic league title, thanks largely to the form of striker Ruud van Nistelrooy who scored an impressive 25 goals during the run-in. The manager also assembled a new defence which included new signing Rio Ferdinand, whose deal broke the transfer record in English football and indeed, the world record for a defender.

The Red Devils started their quest to regain the Premier League title at home to newly promoted West Bromwich Albion and claimed all three points thanks to super-sub Ole Gunnar Solskjær's late goal. Results didn't flow as Ferguson hoped and as early autumn approached, Manchester United had made their worst start since the inauguration of the Premier League, lying in 10th place. Things didn't get better as losses to Bolton Wanderers and Leeds United were eclipsed by a derby day defeat to Manchester City in November which allowed a four-point gap to open between themselves and leaders Liverpool. Following an empathic win against Newcastle United, the team embarked on a run of wins that included rivals Liverpool, struggling West Ham and champions Arsenal to help their Premier League challenge gather ominous momentum. Although they slumped to defeat on Boxing Day at Middlesbrough, the team were in third place, five points short of table-toppers Arsenal at the turn of the year.

The Middlesbrough loss on 26 December turned out to be their last league defeat of the season, as a series of late home wins against Sunderland and Chelsea in January helped pile the pressure somewhat on runaway leaders Arsenal, who were struggling with a minor goalkeeping crisis. After United drew at Bolton in the late evening kick-off on 22 February, Arsenal had the chance to open a five-point gap at the Premier League summit if they won at Maine Road. A five-star performance ensured this through a rampant display of attacking football that virtually put one hand on the trophy. However the difference in the title race was later whittled down to two after Blackburn completed a sensational double over the reigning champions at home while United recorded a victory over Aston Villa thanks to a David Beckham goal.

April began with a ruthless win at Old Trafford against Liverpool, which helped them reclaim top spot albeit temporarily. However, Kolo Touré's late own goal gifted Aston Villa a point when Arsenal perhaps should have taken all three. By the end of the week, just goal difference separated the top two, favouring the Gunners. A 6–2 rout at Newcastle preceded the game of the season: against Arsenal at Highbury. A 2–2 draw did not prove to be decisive, but it was advantage Manchester United, who maintained a three-point lead, although the Gunners had a game in hand and a slightly superior goal difference. Despite more European disappointment – this time at the hands of Real Madrid through an impressive performance by Ronaldo – a comeback by Bolton Wanderers dented Arsenal's hopes of retaining the double and installed Manchester United as sole favourites to win the league. They cruised to a 4–1 home win against Charlton Athletic and clinched their eighth title in eleven seasons after Arsenal lost at home to Leeds a day later.

Manchester United wrapped up their successful league campaign with a 2–1 victory at Everton, David Beckham scored United's leveller in what was his last appearance for the club.

Pre-season and friendlies

Premier League

Manchester United started their attempts to regain the Premier League title with a home match against newly promoted West Bromwich Albion. Although the fans were confident of taking maximum points they had to wait until the 78th minute for Ole Gunnar Solskjær, the late-goal specialist, to give them the lead with his 100th goal for the club. They could not add to their one-goal advantage, despite West Brom having to play with ten men with Derek McInnes being sent off for two bookings, the second for a foul on Nicky Butt in the 64th minute, but held on to begin the season with victory.

FA Cup

League Cup

UEFA Champions League

Third qualifying round

Group stage

Second group stage

Knockout phase

Squad statistics

Transfers
United's first departure of the 2002–03 season was Nick Culkin, who was released on 7 July. Trinidad and Tobago forward Dwight Yorke left United for Blackburn Rovers on 26 July for £2 million. Culkin and Yorke were United's only summer departures, but they were not United's only departures of the 2002–03 season.

United's only arrivals of the 2002–03 season were Rio Ferdinand, who joined from United's fierce rivals Leeds United, and Spanish goalkeeper Ricardo, who signed for just £1.5 million.

On 5 June, Lee Roche was released from United on a free transfer. On 30 June, defender Laurent Blanc announced his retirement from football. Also on 30 June, David May was released.

In

Out

Loan out

References

Manchester United F.C. seasons
Manchester United
2003